USCGC Ida Lewis (WLM-551) is the lead ship of the United States Coast Guard Keeper-class of Coastal Buoy Tenders.  Launched in 1995, she has spent her entire career maintaining navigational aids near her homeport of Newport, Rhode Island.

Construction 
Ida Lewis was built by Marinette Marine Corporation in Marinette, Wisconsin.    The contract for the construction of the ship was awarded in June 1993, and the keel was laid in August 1994.  The contract price was $22 million. The ship was launched on October 14, 1995 into the Menominee River.  She was the first of the fourteen Keeper-class vessels completed.  The featured speaker at the christening ceremony was Coast Guard Commandant Admiral Robert E. Kramek.  His wife, Patricia, christened the ship.

The hull is built of welded steel plate.

Keeper-class ships, including Ida Lewis, use z-drives for propulsion instead of fixed propellers and rudders.   The z-drives may be synchronized to point in the same direction when underway.  The ship is steered by changing the direction of the thrust.  For fine maneuvering or station keeping while working on a buoy, the two z-drives may be pointed in different directions.  These are combined with a bow thruster to allow the ship to remain at the same spot in the sea, a capability known as dynamic positioning. The two z-drives are powered by two Caterpillar 3508 TA Diesel engines.

Electrical power is provided by three Caterpillar 3406 generators.

The ship has a 42-foot long boom crane capable of lifting 10 tons onto her buoy deck.  This allows floating buoys to be hoisted aboard for maintenance.  The buoy deck is 1,335 square feet in area.

Ida Lewis, as all Keeper-class buoy tenders, has an ice-strengthened hull so that she may continue to service navigational aids in light ice conditions. There is an "ice-belt" of thicker steel at the ship's waterline to resist ice damage to the hull. The bow is shaped to ride up over the ice and crush it with the ship's weight. Her performance in ice conditions varies with the quality of the ice, the amount of power applied, and other factors.

This boat was estimated to cost $210,000.

The ship's namesake is Ida Lewis, keeper of the Lime Rock lighthouse.   She saved the lives of 24 people over her career at the lighthouse, the first at the age of 16.  She served until her death at the age of 69.

Operational history 

After her launch and sea trials, Ida Lewis sailed down the Great Lakes and Saint Lawrence Seaway to reach her homeport of Newport in the fall of 1996.  She was commissioned there on April 12, 1997.  The ship is based at Naval Station Newport.

Ida Lewis''' primary mission is to maintain 374 fixed and floating aids to navigation from Long Island Sound, New York to Cape Cod, Massachusetts.  The ship also supports search and rescue, and security missions.  The ship was called upon for ice-breaking duty in Narragansett Bay in 2015.Ida Lewis participated in the 2008 New York City Fleet Week observance.

On February 2, 2010 Ida Lewis'' hosted Secretary of the Interior Ken Salazar on a tour of the potential  location for the Cape Wind offshore wind farm in Nantucket Sound.

References 

Ships of the United States Coast Guard
1995 ships